The following outline is provided as an overview of and topical guide to death:

Death – termination of all biological functions that sustain a living organism

What is death? 

Death can be described as all of the following:
 End of life – life is the characteristic distinguishing physical entities having signaling and self-sustaining processes from those that do not, either because such functions have ceased (death), or because they lack such functions and are classified as inanimate.
 (Death is) the opposite of:
 Life – (see above)
 Biogenesis – production of new living organisms or organelles. The law of biogenesis, attributed to Louis Pasteur, is the observation that living things come only from other living things, by reproduction (e.g. a spider lays eggs, which develop into spiders).
 Fertilisation (Conception) – the beginning of an organism's life, initiated by the fusion of gametes resulting in the development of a new individual organism. In animals, the process involves the fusion of an ovum with a sperm, which eventually leads to the development of an embryo.
 Birth – act or process of bearing or bringing forth offspring. In mammals, the process is initiated by hormones which cause the muscular walls of the uterus to contract, expelling the fetus at a developmental stage when it is ready to feed and breathe. Commonly considered the beginning of one's life. "First you are born, then you live life, then you die."
 De-extinction – process of creating an organism, which is a member of or resembles an extinct species, or a breeding population of such organisms. Cloning is the most widely proposed method, although selective breeding has also been proposed. Similar techniques have been applied to endangered species. Though we have not yet brought an extinct species back to life
 Survival – Survival is simply the need to live, the only real purpose of an organism is to generate offspring
 Indefinite lifespan – term used in the life extension movement and transhumanism to refer to the hypothetical longevity of humans (and other life-forms) under conditions in which aging is effectively and completely prevented and treated. Their lifespans would be "indefinite" (that is, they would not be "immortal") because protection from the effects of aging on health does not guarantee survival. Such individuals would still be susceptible to accidental or intentional death by disease, starvation, getting hit by a truck, murdered, and so on, but not death from aging, some animals can live forever such as the Turritopsis doohmii jellyfish, or the bowhead whale.

Types of death 
 Individual death – termination of all biological functions within a living organism
 Extinction – death of an entire species, or more specifically, death of the last member of a species
 Extinction event – widespread and rapid decrease in the amount of life on Earth. Such an event is identified by a sharp reduction in the diversity and abundance of macroscopic life. Also known as a mass extinction or biotic crisis.
 Human extinction – hypothesized end of the human species. Various scenarios have been discussed in science, popular culture, and religion (see Eschatology)
 Local extinction (extirpation) – condition of a species (another taxon) that ceases to exist in the chosen geographic area of study, though it still exists elsewhere. Local extinctions are contrasted with global extinctions. Local extinction can be reversed by reintroduction of the species to the area from other locations; wolf reintroduction is an example of this.

Causes of death

Causes of death, by type 
 Accidents – unplanned events or circumstances, often with lack of intention or necessity. They generally have negative outcomes which might have been avoided or prevented had circumstances leading up to each accident had been recognized, and acted upon, prior to occurrence. An example of a type of accident that can cause death is a traffic collision.
 List of accident types
 Biological aging –
 Disease –
 Terminal illness
 Injury
 Wound
 Mortal wound
 Killing – causing the death of a living organism, usually for the purpose of survival, including the defense of self and or others.
 Predation –
 Homicide –
 Murder – killing of a human done in malice
 Human sacrifice
 Sacrifice
 Human sacrifice
 Animal sacrifice
 Suicide – act of intentionally causing one's own death. Suicide is often carried out as a result of despair, the cause of which is frequently attributed to a mental disorder such as depression, bipolar disorder, schizophrenia, borderline personality disorder, alcoholism, or drug abuse. Stress factors such as financial difficulties or troubles with interpersonal relationships often play a role. Efforts to prevent suicide include limiting access to firearms, treating mental illness and drug misuse, and improving economic circumstances.
 Assisted suicide –
 Copycat suicide –
 Familicide –
 Forced suicide –
 Honor suicide –
 Internet suicide pact –
 Mass suicide –
 Murder–suicide –
 Suicide pact –
 Parasuicide –
 Suicide attack –
 Suicide by cop –
 Capital punishment – legal process whereby a person is put to death by the state as a punishment for a crime. The judicial decree that someone is punished in this manner is a death sentence, while the actual enforcement is an execution. Also called the "death penalty".
 List of methods of capital punishment
 Genocide – systematic destruction of all or a significant part of a racial, ethnic, religious or national group. Well-known examples of genocide include the Holocaust, the Armenian genocide, and more recently the Rwandan genocide.
 War – organized and often prolonged conflict that is carried out by states or non-state actors. It is generally characterized by extreme violence, social disruption and an attempt at economic destruction. War should be understood as an actual, intentional and widespread armed conflict between political communities, and therefore is defined as a form of (collective) political violence or intervention. The set of techniques used by a group to carry out war is known as warfare.
 Laughing oneself to death (extremely rare) –
 Natural disasters –
 Avalanches –
 Earthquakes –
 Volcanic eruptions –
 Hydrological disasters – disasters involving bodies of water
 Floods –
 Limnic eruptions –
 Tsunamis –
 Meteorological disasters – disasters involving weather phenomena
 Blizzards –
 Cyclonic storms –
 Tropical cyclones –
 Extratropical cyclones –
 Droughts –
 Hailstorms –
 Heat waves –
 Tornadoes –
 Wildfires –
 Epidemics –
 Space disasters –
 Impact events –
 Solar flares –

Other classifications of causes of death 
 Causes of death by rate
 Potential causes of death
 Global catastrophic risks –
 Preventable causes of death

Effects of death 
 Effects of the anticipation of death
 Death anxiety – morbid, abnormal or persistent fear of one's own death or the process of his/her dying. One definition of death anxiety is a "feeling of dread, apprehension or solicitude (anxiety) when one thinks of the process of dying, or ceasing to 'be'". Also known as thanatophobia (fear of death).
 Mortality salience –
 Effects on the deceased (and on the cadaver) – "deceased" is short for "deceased person", which is a person who has died and who is therefore dead.  A cadaver is the body of a dead person.
 End of consciousness – a dead body is no longer awake, but there is the question of where consciousness went to, if anywhere...
 Is there consciousness after death? – there is a debate between proponents of the following possibilities:
 Eternal oblivion
 Afterlife
 Cessation of breathing
 Cardiac arrest – the heart has stopped beating (no pulse)
 Pallor mortis – paleness which happens in the 15–120 minutes after death
 Livor mortis – settling of the blood in the lower (dependent) portion of the body
 Algor mortis – reduction in body temperature following death. This is generally a steady decline until matching ambient temperature
 Rigor mortis – limbs of the corpse become stiff (Latin rigor) and difficult to move or manipulate
 Decomposition – reduction into simpler forms of matter, accompanied by a strong, unpleasant odor.
 Putrefaction –
 Other (possible) effects
 Death erection –
 Treatment of corpses
 In the wild
 Consumed by predators (if those predators made the kill) – a predator is an organism that hunts and then eats its prey
 Consumed by scavengers – a scavenger is an animal that feeds on dead animal and/or plant material present in its habitat
 Decomposed by detritivores – detritivores are organisms which recycle detritus, returning it to the environment for reuse in the food chain. Examples of detritivores include earthworms, woodlice and dung beetles.
 Fossilization
 Catagenesis
 In society
 Embalming
 Disposal of human corpses
 Burial
 Burial at sea
 Natural burial
 Sky burial
 Cremation
 Preservation of human corpses
 Cryonics
 Effects on others
 Grief –
 Mourning –
 Depression –

History of death 
 Deaths of people
 Deaths by year
 Deaths of philosophers
 Unusual deaths
 Disasters by death toll
 Natural disasters by death toll
 Wars and anthropogenic disasters by death toll
 People by cause of death
 TV actors who died during production
 Deaths of other species
 Timeline of extinctions
 Fascination with death
 History of dissection
 Mummification
 Premature obituaries

Philosophy and death 
 Meaning of life

Death and culture 

Death and culture
 Obituary
 Death and the Internet
 Disposal of human corpses
 Expressions related to death
 Personification of death – the concept of Death as a sentient entity has existed in many societies since the beginning of recorded history. For example, in English culture, Death is often given the name "the Grim Reaper" and, from the 15th century onwards, came to be shown as a skeletal figure carrying a large scythe and clothed in a black cloak with a hood.
 Wake

Medical field and death 

 Abortion
 Autopsy
 Cadaveric spasm
 Death rattle
 End-of-life care
 Euthanasia
 Lazarus sign
 Lazarus syndrome
 Medical definition of death
 Brain death
 Clinical death
 Death by natural causes
 Unnatural death
 Mortal wound
 Organ donation
 Terminal illness

Politics of death 
 Assisted suicide
 Martyr
 Mass grave
 Right to life
 Right to life debates
 Abortion debate
 Capital punishment debate
 Capital punishment debate in the United States
 Euthanasia debate
 Right to die
 Euthanasia
 Euthanasia debate
 War

Legalities of death 
 Abortion law
 Autopsy
 Cause of death – the purpose of a forensic autopsy is to determine the cause of death, which is the condition or conditions officially determined to have resulted in a human's death. In modern times, such a determination usually is essential data on a governmental death certificate.
 Capital punishment
 Death row
 Coroner
 Crimes related to death
 Crimes against humanity related to death
 Murder
 Massacre
 Genocide
 Death threat
 Homicide
 Manslaughter
 Murder
 Homicide occurring during a felony
 Necrophilia
 Disposal of human corpses
 Disposition of the estate of the deceased
 Probate
 Administration of an estate on death
 Inheritance
 Probate court
 Probate law
 Will
 Trust law
 Legal death
 Declared death in absentia
 Death certificate
 Cause of death
 Right to die

Religion and death 
 Religious beliefs concerning death
 Afterlife
 Heaven
 Hell
 Resurrection
 Religious ceremonies concerning death
 Last rites
 Funeral
 Eulogy
 Wake

Death care industry 
Death care industry – companies and organizations that provide services related to death (i.e., funerals, cremation or burial, and memorials).
 Death care industry sectors
 Cemeteries –
 Coffin industry –
 Funeral homes –
 Crematory industry –
 Stonemasonry – craft of creating buildings, structures (including memorials), and sculpture (including headstones), using stone from the earth.
 Headstone industry –
 Memorial industry –
 Death care industry products and services
 Coffins (product) –
 Funerals (service) –
 Burial (service) –
 Cremation (service) –
 Headstones (product) –
 Memorials (product) –
 Death care professionals
 Funeral director –
 Stonemason – using stone from the earth, stonemasons create buildings, structures, and sculpture, including headstones and memorials.
 Death care companies
 Service Corporation International
 Stewart Enterprises

Science of death 
 Forensic pathology
 Funeral director
 Mortuary science
 Necrobiology
 Taphonomy
 Thanatology

Psychology of death 
 death anxiety
 Morbid curiosity

Demography of death 
 Karōshi
 Maternal death
 Mortality displacement
 Mortality rate
 Maternal death
 Perinatal mortality
 Infant mortality
 Child mortality

Paranormal concepts pertaining to death 
 Pseudoscience
 Paranormal research
 Parapsychology
 Reincarnation research
 Death-related paranormal phenomena
 Deathbed phenomena
 Afterlife
 After-death communication
 Séance
 Ghosts
 Near-death experience
 Near-death studies
 Necromancy

Death-related organizations 
 Grief support
 Mothers of Murdered Offspring
 Rainbows
 The Grief Recovery Institute
 Organizations dedicated to the abolition of capital punishment (death penalty)
 International
 Amnesty International
 Buddhist Peace Fellowship
 Human Rights Watch
 International Committee Against Executions
 Reprieve (organisation)
 World Coalition Against the Death Penalty
 In the United States
 Campaign to End the Death Penalty
 Conservatives Concerned About the Death Penalty
 Death Penalty Focus
 National Coalition to Abolish the Death Penalty
 People of Faith Against the Death Penalty
 Texas Moratorium Network
 Texas Students Against the Death Penalty
 Witness to Innocence

Death-related publications 
 Book of the Dead
 The American Way of Death, by Jessica Mitford
 The American Way of Death Revisited, by Jessica Mitford
 The Japanese Way of Death, by Hikaru Suzuki
 Tibetan Book of the Dead''

Dead people 
 Lists of deaths by year

Other 

 Immortality
 Preventable causes of death
 Coffin birth
 Post-mortem interval
 Promession
 Resomation

 political/legal
 Cause of death
 Death-qualified jury
 Dying declaration
 Faked death
 Inquest
 Suspicious death

 After death
 Other aspects
 Afterlife
 Cemetery
 Customs
 Death mask
 Eternal oblivion
 Examination
 Funeral
 Grief
 Intermediate state
 Mourning
 Resurrection
 Taboo on the dead
 Vigil

 Other
 Death anniversary
 death anxiety
 Death deity
 Personification of death
 Dying-and-rising god
 Psychopomp
 Death camp
 Death drive
 Death education
 Death hoax
 Death knell
 Death march
 Death messenger
 Death notification
 Death poem
 Death squad
 Festival of the dead
 Necrophobia
 The Order of the Good Death
 Spiritual death
 Thanatosensitivity
 Undead

See also 
 Outline of life science

References

External links 

 

Death
Death
Life